Dinoperca is a genus in the family Dinopercidae (cavebasses). It prefers to inhabit the spaces under ledges, as well as the mouths of caves. It is of minor importance to local commercial fisheries, but is popular as a sport fish. The identity of the person honoured in the specific name is not stated but Day thanks "Professor Peters" for his assistance in identifying the type who was Director of the Berlin Museum, this refers to Wilhelm Peters (1815-1883).

References

External links
 Photograph

Dinopercidae
Fish described in 1875
Monotypic marine fish genera